Peggy Connelly (September 25, 1931 – June 11, 2007) was an American singer and actress.

Early years 
Connelly was born in Shreveport, Louisiana, and raised in Fort Worth, Texas. Her parents were Mr. and Mrs. George F. Connelly, and she has four siblings. As a teenager, she sang for military personnel in Texas in shows sponsored by the Red Cross and the USO. She also worked as a model for photographers and in fashion shows.

Career 
Connelly's singing career began on radio stations in Fort Worth and with local dance bands (the first Harvey Anderson's) in the Fort Worth-Dallas area. In 1956 she recorded an album of standards, Peggy Connelly with Rusell Garcia – That Old Black Magic, for Bethlehem Records, reissued by Fresh Sound on Russell Garcia's Wigville Band. She also recorded two albums with The New Christy Minstrels.

Connelly appeared in The Girl in the Red Velvet Swing (1955), Houseboat (1958), and the television show Take a Good Look with Ernie Kovacs.

She moved to Europe in the early 1970s and worked as a single act until the mid-1990s, when she, Sarah Tullamore and Wendy Taylor formed a trio called The Jazzberries. The Jazzberries played extensively in Paris and throughout Europe until they disbanded in 2000.

Personal life 
On November 13, 1957, in Cleveland, Ohio, Connelly married Dick Martin. They divorced in the early 1960s.

References

Sources
[ AllMusic Guide: New Christy Minstrels]
Bethlehem Records Discography: 1956

Obituary: Peggy Lou Connelly Star-Telegram. July 1, 2007. Accessed July 9, 2007.

1931 births
2007 deaths
American film actresses
Actresses from Texas
Singers from Texas
People from Fort Worth, Texas
20th-century American singers
20th-century American women singers
20th-century American actresses
The New Christy Minstrels members
21st-century American women